The Jeanneau Yachts 51, also called the Jeanneau 51, is a French sailboat. The hull was designed by Philippe Briand, the interior by Andrew Winch and finishing by the Jeanneau Design Office. It was designed as a blue water cruiser and first built in 2015.

Production
The design was built by Jeanneau in France, starting in 2015, but it is now out of production.

Design
The Jeanneau Yachts 51 is a recreational keelboat, built predominantly of polyester fiberglass, with wood trim. The hull is of solid fiberglass, while the deck is a fiberglass sandwich design. It has a fractional sloop rig, with a deck-stepped mast, two sets of swept spreaders and aluminum spars with discontinuous stainless steel wire rigging. In-mast mainsail furling is an option. The hull has a plumb stem, a reverse transom with a tailgate style fold-down swimming platform, an internally mounted spade-type rudder controlled by dual wheels and a "L"-shaped fixed fin keel with a weighted bulb or optional shoal-draft keel. The fin keel model displaces  empty and carries  of cast iron ballast, while the shoal-draft version displaces  and carries  of cast iron ballast.

There is a  holding tank.

Factory options included electric winches, air conditioning, a bowsprit

The design was built with a number of interior arrangements, providing sleeping accommodation for four to six people. A typical interior layout includes a double island berth in the bow cabin, a "U"-shaped settee and a straight settee in the main cabin and an aft cabin with a double berth on the port side. The aft cabin may be subdivided to provide an additional single or double berth. The galley is located on the starboard side just forward of the companionway ladder. The galley is "J"-shaped and is equipped with a stove, an ice box and a double sink. A navigation station is opposite the galley, on the port side. With two cabins there are two heads, one in the bow cabin on the starboard side and one on the port side in the aft cabin. When an additional cabin is fitted, a third head may be provided aft on the starboard side.

Operational history
In a 2017 review Zuzana Prochazka wrote, "the most notable characteristic of the J51 under sail is her balance. In 17 knots of breeze at 40 degrees apparent wind angle, our test boat blazed along at 8.1 knots with only light fingertip control on the helm. She basically sailed herself and pointed impressively high. As we eased off and the wind dropped to 11 knots, the Technique Voile sails drew us along at 7.6 knots on a beam reach."

See also
List of sailing boat types

References

External links

Keelboats
2000s sailboat type designs
Sailboat type designs by Philippe Briand
Sailboat type designs by Jeanneau Design Office
Sailboat type designs by Andrew Winch
Sailboat types built by Jeanneau